In the pottery of ancient Greece, a kylix (also spelled cylix; pl.: kylikes) is the most common type of wine-drinking cup.  It has a broad, relatively shallow, body raised on a stem from a foot and usually two horizontal handles disposed symmetrically.  The main alternative wine-cup shape was the kantharos, with a narrower and deeper cup and high vertical handles.

The almost flat interior circle of the base of the cup, called the tondo, was generally the primary surface for painted decoration in the black-figure or red-figure pottery styles of the 6th and 5th century BC, and the outside was also often painted. As the representations would be covered with wine, the scenes would only be revealed in stages as the wine was drained. They were often designed with this in mind, with scenes created so that they would surprise or titillate the drinker as they were revealed.

Etymology
The word comes from the Greek kylix ("cup"), which is cognate with Latin calix, the source of the English word "chalice" but not related to the similar Greek word κάλυξ : calyx which means "husk" or "pod".  The term seems to have been rather more generally used in ancient Greece.  Individual examples and the many named sub-varieties of kylix are often called names just using "cup".  Like all other types of Greek pottery vessels, they are also covered by the general term of "vase".

Purpose
The primary use for the kylix was drinking wine (usually mixed with water, and sometimes other flavourings) at a symposium or male "drinking party" in the ancient Greek world, so they are often decorated with scenes of a humorous, light-hearted, or sexual nature that would only become visible when the cup was drained. Dionysos, the god of wine, and his satyrs or related komastic scenes, are common subjects. On the external surface sometimes, large eyes were depicted, probably also with humorous purposes (eye-cup). Other humorous purposes would include designs on the base of the cup, such as the male genitals on the Bomford Cup, a late 6th century kylix. The shape of the kylix enabled the drinker to drink whilst recumbent, as was the case in the symposia. It also enabled them to play kottabos, a game played by flinging wine lees at targets.

A typical bowl held roughly 8 oz/250ml of fluid, though this varied greatly with size and shape.

Sub-types
There are many sub-types of kylix, variously defined by their basic shape, the location or subject of their painting, or their main place of production, or often a combination of these. Several of these are grouped under the term of Little-Master cup. The sub-types include:

Decoration

After the kylikes were formed, an artisan drew a depiction of an event from Greek mythology or everyday life with a diluted glaze on the outer surface of the formation.

Inside the drinking bowl was often a portrait of dancing and/or festive drinking. Unique compositional skills were necessary for the artisans to attain due to the lack of verticals and horizontals on the surface. Onesimos, Makron, and Douris were famous painters in this field, renowned for their works.

Famous pieces
Individual kylixes with articles include: 
Arkesilas Cup, very unusual because it shows a then-living political figure, Arkesilaos II, king of Kyrene (d. 550 BC). It is dated to about 565/560 BC, and is now in Paris.
Dionysus Cup, famous for its painting, 540–530 BC. It is one of the masterpieces of the Attic Black-figure potter Exekias and one of the most significant works in the Staatliche Antikensammlungen in Munich.
Berlin Foundry Cup, a red-figure kylix from the early 5th century BC. It is the name vase of the Attic vase painter known conventionally as the Foundry Painter. Its most striking feature is the exterior depiction of activities in an Athenian bronze workshop or foundry. It is an important source on ancient Greek metal-working technology.
Brygos Cup of Würzburg, an Attic red-figure kylix from about 480 BC. It was made by the Brygos potter and painted by the man known as the Brygos Painter. Its symposium scenes are some of the best-known images of Greek pottery.

See also
Gordion cup

References

External links

Ancient Greek pot shapes
Wine accessories
Drinkware
History of wine